This article displays the qualifying draw of the 2011 Swedish Open.

Players

Seeds

Qualifiers

Qualifying draw

First qualifier

Second qualifier

Third qualifier

Fourth qualifier

References
 Qualifying draw

2011 - qualifying
Swedish Open - qualifying

id:Swedish Open 2011 – Kualifikasi Tunggal Putri